Minkowski, Mińkowski or Minkovski (Slavic feminine: Minkowska, Mińkowska or Minkovskaya; plural: Minkowscy, Mińkowscy;) is a surname of Polish origin. It may refer to:

 Minkowski or Mińkowski, a coat of arms of Polish nobility
Alyona Minkovski (born 1986), Russian-American correspondent and presenter
 Eugène Minkowski (1885–1972), French psychiatrist
 Hermann Minkowski (1864–1909) Russian-born German mathematician and physicist, known for:
 Minkowski addition
 Minkowski–Bouligand dimension
 Minkowski diagram
 Minkowski distance
 Minkowski functional
 Minkowski inequality
 Minkowski space
 Null vector (Minkowski space)
 Minkowski plane
 Minkowski's theorem
 Minkowski's question mark function
 Abraham–Minkowski controversy
 Hasse–Minkowski theorem
 Minkowski separation theorem
 Smith–Minkowski–Siegel mass formula
Christopher Minkowski (born 1953), American Indologist 
Khristian Minkovski (born 1971), Bulgarian swimmer 
 Marc Minkowski (born 1962), French conductor
 Oskar Minkowski (1858–1931), German physician
 Peter Minkowski (born 1941), Swiss physicist
 Pinhas Minkowsky (1859–1924), Russian hazzan
 Rudolph Minkowski (1895–1976), German-American astronomer

Jewish surnames
Polish-language surnames
Slavic-language surnames